Hynes is a surname, many examples of which originate as the anglicisation the Irish name Ó hEidhin.

Etymology

According to the Oxford Dictionary of Family Names in Britain and Ireland, the modern name Hynes and its variants derive from two quite different medieval names.
 The Irish Ó hEidhin, which means 'descendant of Eidhin'. The dictionary adds that Eidhin itself is 'a personal name of uncertain origin. It may be a derivative of eidhean "ivy", or it may represent an altered form of the place-name Aidhne’ and that 'the principal family of this name is descended from Guaire of Aidhne, King of Connacht. From the 7th century for over a thousand years they were chiefs of a territory in east County Galway. There appears to have been another branch of the family located in east County Limerick'.
 The Middle English name Hine (with the addition of the genitive -s case ending, implying that the name-bearer was the child of a father called Hine, or addition of -s on the analogy of such names). This occupational name derives from Old English hīne ('household servant, farm labourer'), but in the Middle English period could also mean 'farm manager' and also be used of high-status people serving in a lordly household.

Distribution
Around 2011, there were 3320 bearers of the surname Hynes in Great Britain and 3605 in Ireland. In 1881, there were 717 bearers of the name in Great Britain, with higher frequencies in the north of England, especially Lancashire; Devon and Cornwall; and also central Scotland, especially Lanarkshire.

People

Notable people with surname include:

Eidhean mac Cléireach, fl. 800, ancestor of the Ó hEidhin/Hynes family of south County Galway
Andrew Hynes (1750–1800), founder of Elizabethtown, Kentucky
Charles J. Hynes, former District Attorney of Kings County, New York
Daniel Hynes (born 1968), Comptroller of the State of Illinois
Devonte Hynes, musician known under the moniker Blood Orange, former member of the band Test Icicles
Garry Hynes, award-winning Irish theatre director
Jessica Hynes (born 1972), English actress and writer, most renowned as one of the stars of the UK sitcom Spaced
James Hynes (born 1955), contemporary American novelist
John Hynes (politician) (1897–1970), Massachusetts politician, mayor of Boston 1950-1960
Jon Hynes, American classical concert pianist
Laurence Hynes Halloran (1765–1831), pioneer schoolteacher and journalist in Australia
Marc Hynes (born 1978), British race car driver
Martin Hynes, American screenwriter, director, actor and producer of independent films
Mary Hynes (broadcaster), Canadian radio and television broadcaster
Peter Hynes (footballer) (born 1983), Irish footballer
Peter Hynes (rugby union) (born 1982), Australian rugby union player
Ron Hynes, Canadian folk singer-songwriter from Newfoundland
Samuel Hynes (1924–2019), American historian and writer
Thomas Hynes (1938–2019), American lawyer and politician
Tyler Hynes (born 1986), Canadian actor
Fictional characters
Joe Hynes, character in James Joyce's novel Ulysses

Places
Hynes, California now part of Paramount, California

See also
Hynes Convention Center, a  exhibition center in Boston's Back Bay
Hynes Convention Center (MBTA station), the MBTA stop at Convention Center
Hyness, a character in Kirby Star Allies
Hynes Athletic Center, a 2,611-seat multi-purpose arena in New Rochelle, New York
Hines (disambiguation)
Hein, a surname (including a list of people with the name)
Heini, a given name and a surname (including a list of people with the name)
Heyne, a surname (including a list of people with the name)
Heine, a surname
Heines, a surname
Hines (name), a name
Heinie (disambiguation)

References

Surnames
English-language surnames
Anglicised Irish-language surnames
Surnames of Irish origin
Surnames of British Isles origin